The wall of death is a carnival or fairground sideshow.

Wall of death may also refer to:
 Wall of death (moshing)
 Wall of Death (film)
 The Wall of Death, a public art installation in Seattle, Washington, US

Music
 "Wall of Death" (Murphy's Law song)
 "Wall of Death" (Richard and Linda Thompson song)